Morency is a village in the Les Cayes commune of the Les Cayes Arrondissement, in the Sud department of Haiti.

References

Populated places in Sud (department)